The Glade-Donald House is a historic house in Grand Island, Nebraska. It was built in 1905 for Henry Glade, a German immigrant, and designed in the Shingle style. It was acquired and remodelled by Lawrence Donald, a Scottish immigrant, in 1918, and purchased by his brother John Donald, also from Scotland, in 1934. The latter hired Russell Rohrer to redecorate its interior with new wallpapers and chandeliers. The house has been listed on the National Register of Historic Places since September 12, 1985.

References

External links

Houses completed in 1905
National Register of Historic Places in Hall County, Nebraska
Shingle Style houses
Shingle Style architecture in Nebraska
1905 establishments in Nebraska